is a town located in Tokachi Subprefecture, Hokkaido, Japan.

As of September 2016, the town has an estimated population of 7,182 and a density of 12 persons per km2. The total area is 596.14 km2.

Hiroo is recognized as the only place in Japan to be designated as a "Santa-Land" from the municipal government of Oslo, Norway.

Climate
Although cold for its latitude and coastal position, the humid continental climate (Köppen Dfb) of Hiroo is moderated by East Asian standards. Summers are cooled by the ocean and cloudy weather, whereas the influence of the Siberian landmass drops temperatures in winter. Due to the ice-free nature of the ocean, Hiroo stays narrowly above freezing during days, whereas nights regularly drop beneath .

Culture

Mascots

Sata-chan is a girl who wanted to become a successor to Santa Claus as she is one of his granddaughters. However, she must know Hiroo first and then various cities/towns/villages and countries. She birthday is October 26 (Ironically, her birthday is six days away from Halloween). She was unveiled in 2013 before becoming the one of the mascots of the town on 12 November 2014. She resides in Hiroo Santa Land. She is designed by a first grader at Hiroo Elementary School.
Tree-kun is a Christmas tree. He is unveiled in 1995. He joins Sata-kun to search for  who is missing for years. He resides in Daimaruyama Forest Park. As Sata-chan's assissant, he is in charge of collecting energy.

Notable people from Hiroo
Ichiro Nakagawa, politician
Yoshio Nakagawa, politician
Hokutoumi Nobuyoshi, former sumo wrestler

References

External links

 Official Website 
 Santa Land Hiroo 

Towns in Hokkaido
Port settlements in Japan
Populated coastal places in Japan